"Yo-Yo" is a song written by Joe South and first released as a single by Billy Joe Royal in 1966, peaking at #117 on the Billboard Hot 100 chart, and #28 in Canada. The Osmonds covered the song and released it as a single on September 4, 1971.

It reached #3 on the Billboard Hot 100 on October 16, 1971.  The song was included on the Osmonds' 1972 album, Phase III.  It was certified Gold by the RIAA on November 17, 1971. Joe South also recorded his own version for his self-titled 1971 album.

Charts
The Osmonds version

Certifications

References

External links
Genius: Yo-Yo - Lyrics

1966 songs
1966 singles
1971 singles
Songs written by Joe South
Billy Joe Royal songs
The Osmonds songs
RPM Top Singles number-one singles
Columbia Records singles
MGM Records singles